The canton of La Guerche-de-Bretagne is an administrative division of the Ille-et-Vilaine department, in northwestern France. At the French canton reorganisation which came into effect in March 2015, it was expanded from 12 to 31 communes. Its seat is in La Guerche-de-Bretagne.

It consists of the following communes: 
 
Arbrissel 
Argentré-du-Plessis
Availles-sur-Seiche
Bais
Brielles
Chelun
Coësmes
Domalain
Drouges
Eancé
Essé
Étrelles
Forges-la-Forêt
Gennes-sur-Seiche
La Guerche-de-Bretagne
Marcillé-Robert 
Martigné-Ferchaud
Moulins
Moussé
Moutiers
Le Pertre
Rannée
Retiers
Saint-Germain-du-Pinel
Sainte-Colombe
La Selle-Guerchaise
Le Theil-de-Bretagne
Thourie
Torcé
Vergéal
Visseiche

References

Cantons of Ille-et-Vilaine